Aichwaldsee is a lake of Carinthia, Austria.

References

External links

Lakes of Carinthia (state)